Vazineh District is in Sardasht County, West Azerbaijan province, Iran. At the 2006 National Census, its population was 31,369 in 5,343 households. The following census in 2011 counted 31,040 people in 6,825 households. At the latest census in 2016, the district had 32,259 inhabitants in 8,085 households.

References 

Sardasht County

Districts of West Azerbaijan Province

Populated places in West Azerbaijan Province

Populated places in Sardasht County